Shagufta Malik is a Pakistani politician who has been a member of the Provincial Assembly of Khyber Pakhtunkhwa since August 2018.

Education
She has done Masters in political science.

Political career
She was elected to the Provincial Assembly of Khyber Pakhtunkhwa as a candidate of Awami National Party on a reserved seat for women in 2018 Pakistani general election.

References

Living people
Politicians from Khyber Pakhtunkhwa
Awami National Party MPAs (Khyber Pakhtunkhwa)
Women members of the Provincial Assembly of Khyber Pakhtunkhwa
Year of birth missing (living people)